The Shihcheng is a railway station of Taiwan Railways Administration Yilan line located at Toucheng Township, Yilan County, Taiwan. It is the easternmost train station in Taiwan.

History
The station was opened on 1 May 1953.

See also
 List of railway stations in Taiwan

References

1953 establishments in Taiwan
Railway stations in Yilan County, Taiwan
Railway stations opened in 1953
Railway stations served by Taiwan Railways Administration